Aneurysm was an Italian industrial metal band, formed in 1994 in Verona.

Although initially influenced by 1980s thrash metal bands such as Metallica, Pantera and Fear Factory, Aneurysm has elaborated their own sound, combining thrash with progressive metal and characteristic vocals. Seven years after the first demo-tape "Burst" (1995), their first full-length album "Aware" was released (2002), reviewed with enthusiastic words. In June 2005, Aneurysm began recording "Shades", a 15 tracks concept in which Hansi Kürsch from Blind Guardian appeared as special guest. In 2007 the album was released by Old Ones Records, received very positively by public and critics. Aneurysm define their own genre cyber metal

Members

Members at dissolution
 Gianmaria Carneri - Vocals, Guitar
 Peter Calmasini - Guitar
 Ivano Dalla Brea - Bass
 Jacopo Frapporti - Drums
 Stefano Torregrossa - Keyboards

Former members
 Mirko Zamperini - Bass - 1994/2001
 Enea Cipriani - Bass - 2001/2003
 Marco Piran - Drums - 1994/2010

Discography
 Burst (1995, demo)
 Aware (2002)
 Shades (2007)
 Archaic Life Form (2011)

References

Notations
 Aneurysm official website
 Aneurysm at Encyclopaedia Metallum

Footnotes

External links
 Official website
 Aneurysm at Myspace

Italian thrash metal musical groups
Musical groups established in 1994
1994 establishments in Italy